A cubicle is a partially enclosed office workspace that is separated from neighboring workspaces by partitions that are usually  tall. Its purpose is to isolate office workers and managers from the sights and noises of an open workspace so that they may concentrate with fewer distractions. Cubicles are composed of modular elements such as walls, work surfaces, overhead bins, drawers, and shelving, which can be configured depending on the user's needs. Installation is generally performed by trained personnel, although some cubicles allow configuration changes to be performed by users without specific training.

Cubicles in the 2010s and 2020s are usually equipped with a computer, monitor, keyboard and mouse on the work surface. Cubicles typically have a desk phone. Since many offices use overhead fluorescent lights to illuminate the office, cubicles may or may not have lamps or other additional lighting. Other furniture that is often used in cubicles includes an office chair, a filing cabinet for locking documents away, a bookcase and a coat rack.

The office cubicle was created by designer Robert Propst for Herman Miller, and released in 1967 under the name "Action Office II". Although cubicles are often seen as being symbolic of work in a modern office setting due to their uniformity and blandness, they afford the employee a greater degree of privacy and personalization than in previous work environments, which often consisted of desks lined up in rows within an open room. They do so at a lower cost than individual, private offices.  In some office cubicle workspaces, employees can decorate the walls of their cubicle with posters, pictures and other items.

A cubicle is also called a cubicle desk, office cubicle, cubicle workstation, or simply a cube.  An office filled with cubicles is sometimes called a sea of cubicles, and additionally called pods (such as 4-pod or 8-pod of cubes) or a cube farm. Although humorous, the phrase usually has negative connotations.

Cube farms are found in multiple industries including technology, insurance, and government offices.

Etymology 
The term cubicle comes from the Latin cubiculum, for bed chamber. It was used in English as early as the 15th century. It eventually came to be used for small chambers of all sorts, and for small rooms or study spaces with partitions which do not reach to the ceiling. Like the older carrel desk, a cubicle seeks to give a degree of privacy to the user while taking up minimal space in a large or medium-sized room. 

A satirical joke in the 1870 edition of Punch, or the London Charivari magazine uses "cubicle" in the context of an advertisement for a college dormitory - "The dormitories separate cubicles." The joke appears to ridicule the overly studious word, asking, "But stay, what is a cubicle? Did we ever sleep in a cubicle? No; we should as soon have thought of slumber in a bicycle." The article goes on to explain the Latin origin of the word "cubicle" and its definition.

In 1879, the word "cubicle" appeared in reference to electrical engineering, referring to what is today known as electrical enclosures for switchgears and circuit breakers.

History
Prior to the widespread adoption of cubicles, office workers often worked at desks arranged in rows in an open room, where they were exposed to the sounds and activity of those working around them.

Action Office I 

In 1960, Herman Miller created the Herman Miller Research Corporation under the direction of Robert Propst, and the supervision of George Nelson. Its mission was to solve problems related to the use of furniture, but not the furniture itself. The corporation's first major project was an evaluation of the "office" as it had evolved during the 20th Century, and in particular, how it functioned in the 1960s. Propst's studies included learning about the ways people work in an office, how information travels, and how the office layout affects their performance. Propst consulted with mathematicians, behavioral psychologists, and anthropologists.

Propst concluded from his studies that during the 20th century the office environment had changed substantially, particularly in relation to the amount of information being processed. The amount of information an employee had to analyze, organize, and maintain had increased dramatically. Despite this, the basic layout of the corporate office had remained largely unchanged, with employees sitting behind rows of traditional desks in a large open room, devoid of privacy. Propst's studies suggested that an open environment actually reduced communication between employees, and impeded personal initiative. On this, Propst commented "One of the regrettable conditions of present day offices is the tendency to provide a formula kind of sameness for everyone." In addition, the employees' bodies were suffering from long hours of sitting in one position. Propst concluded that office workers require both privacy and interaction, depending on which of their many duties they were performing.

In 1964, Propst and the Research Corporation developed a plan, which Nelson's office executed in the form of the Action Office I (AO-1), and introduced it in the Herman Miller lineup. AO-1 featured desks and workspaces of varying height which allowed the worker a freedom of movement, and to assume the work position best suited for the task. AO-1 was ideally suited to small professional offices in which managers and employees often interacted using the same furnishings, but wasn't suitable for large corporation offices. In addition, it was expensive and difficult to assemble. Despite its shortcomings, Nelson won the Alcoa Award for the design, neglecting to mention Propst's contribution.

First appearances 
The first offices to incorporate the "Action Office" design were in the Federal Reserve Bank of New York, which contracted with George Nelson and Herman Miller in 1963 to design an innovative office space that could maximize efficiency in a small area. The result was based on Nelson's CPS (Comprehensive Panel System), and featured "pods" of four cubicles arranged in a swastika pattern, each with an "L" shaped desk and overhead storage. Surviving photos of the Federal Reserve Bank offices reveal a design that would not appear much different from a cubicle of today. In 1964 this design was re-used for the Women's Medical Clinic of Lafayette, Indiana. Nelson also used the design in his own New York design offices.

Action Office II
Following the poor sales of the AO-1, Propst and Nelson went back to the drawing board. For several years, Propst and Nelson fought over a disagreement on the work environment best suited to the employee of a corporate office, and Nelson was eventually taken off the project. Nelson's departure left Propst free to indulge in his concept of an office capable of constant change to suit the changing needs of the employee, without having to purchase new furnishings, and allowing the employee a degree of privacy, and the ability to personalize the work environment without impacting the environment of the workers nearby. Propst recognized that people are more productive within a territorial enclave that they can personalize, but also that they require vistas outside their space. Propst's concept was the "back-up", a two- or three-sided vertical division that defined territory and afforded privacy without hindering the ability to view or participate in surrounding activities.

Propst based AO-2 around the mobile wall-unit that defined space. The unit also supported multiple workstation furnishings, which benefited from the vertically oriented work-space. The components were interchangeable, standardized, and simple to assemble and install. More importantly, they were highly flexible, allowing employers to modify the work environment as needs changed. The AO-2 lineup met with unprecedented success, and other manufacturers quickly copied it. In 1978, "Action Office II" was renamed simply "Action Office", and by 2005 had attained sales totaling $5 billion.

Despite becoming Herman Miller's most successful project, Nelson disowned himself from any connection with the "Action Office II" line. In 1970, he sent a letter to Robert Blaich, who had become Herman Miller's Vice-President for Corporate Design and Communication, in which he described the system's "dehumanizing effect as a working environment." He summed up his feeling by saying:

One does not have to be an especially perceptive critic to realize that AO II is definitely not a system which produces an environment gratifying for people in general. But it is admirable for planners looking for ways of cramming in a maximum number of bodies, for "employees" (as against individuals), for "personnel," corporate zombies, the walking dead, the silent majority. A large market.

Internet era 
In 1994 designer Douglas Ball planned and built several iterations of the Clipper or CS-1, a "capsule" desk that resembled the streamlined front fuselage of a fighter plane. Meant as a computer workstation, it had louvers and an integrated ventilation system, as well as a host of built-in features typical of the ergonomic desk. An office space filled with these instead of traditional squarish cubicles would look like a hangar filled with small flight simulators. It was selected for the permanent design collection of the Design Museum in the United Kingdom.

Many cube farms were built during the dotcom boom of 1997-2003.

Between 2000 and 2002, IBM partnered with the office furniture manufacturer Steelcase, and researched the software, hardware, and ergonomic aspects of the cubicle of the future (or the office of the future) under the name "Bluespace". They produced several prototypes of this hi-tech multi screened work space and even exhibited one at Walt Disney World. Bluespace offered movable multiple screens inside and outside, a projection system, advanced individual lighting, heating and ventilation controls, and a host of software applications to orchestrate everything.

By 2005, total sales of Action Office II had reached $5 billion.

Open-plan offices 

During the 2000s and 2010s, open plan offices arose again as a modern response to cubicles, inspired by tech companies in Silicon Valley. Though they predate cubicles and were re-popularized by architects including Frank Lloyd Wright in 1939, 21st-century open plans are sometimes described as a "fad." Open plans have negative consequences on employees' productivity, mental health, and health. 

In 2020, as a result of the COVID-19 pandemic, open-plan offices such as those in True Manufacturing Co. began to put up plexiglass partitions. Demand was so high and materials scarce the use of glass partitions as a protective screen was also widely used - essentially, once again dividing open plans into cubicles.

Impact on society

It is unlikely that any other office furnishings has had as much of a social impact as the introduction of the office cubicle in the 1960s, though the outcome of the cubicle's arrival is still open to debate. 

Author Thomas Hine speculated that the cubicle contributed to breaking the glass ceiling for women in the 1960s. Because women could be excluded from male-dominated open office "bull pens," cubicles allowed women to be promoted into middle management positions without making men uncomfortable.

Writer Geoffrey James of Inc. is also a proponent of cubicles. James argues that cubicles encourage diversity in the workplace, as opposed to open floor plans which he claims favors the socially privileged and creates an uncomfortable environment for others. Therefore, he claims open floor spaces systemically encourage ageism, racism, sexism, and ableism by focusing on young white men as the norm. However, cubicles lead to more overall comfort and therefore more equality in the workplace. 

Cultural commentary about cubicles was done in the 1990s and early 2000s. 

In 1989, controversial cartoonist Scott Adams spoke through his comic strip, Dilbert, to satirize cubicle culture. He depicted an IT company employee who works in a cubicle. In 2001, he teamed up with the design company IDEO to create "Dilbert's Ultimate Cubicle". It included both whimsical aspects, a modular approach and attention to usually-neglected ergonomic details like the change in light orientation as the day advances.

In 1991, Douglas Coupland has coined the phrase "veal-fattening pen", a deprecation of cubicles in his novel Generation X: Tales for an Accelerated Culture. 

In 1999, cubicles were depicted in sci-fi movie The Matrix, in which a programmer who is moonlighting as a hacker spends his days in a drab cubicle.

The 1999 comedy Office Space depicts a bored group of IT workers who work in cubicles.

See also
 List of desk forms and types
 Architectural acoustics
 Sound masking

References

Bibliography
 Adams, Scott. What Do You call a Sociopath in a Cubicle?: (Answer, a Coworker) Kansas City, Missouri: Andrews McMeel Pub., 2002.
 Blunden, Bill. Cube Farm. Berkeley: Apress, 2004.
 Duffy, Francis. Colin Cave. John Worthington, editors. Planning Office Space. London: The Architectural Press Ltd., 1976.
 Inkeles, Gordon. Ergonomic Living: How to Create a User-Friendly Home and Office. New York: Simon and Schuster, 1994.
 Klein, Judy Graf. The Office Book. New York: Facts on File Inc., 1982.
 Schlosser, Julie. "Cubicles: The great mistake." CNNMoney.com, 2006
 Saval, Nikil. Cubed: A Secret History of the Workplace, Doubleday, 2014.

External links

 CNN/Fortune - Cubicles: The great mistake
 Cubitopia  Article on the utopian ideal of the cubicle

Desks
Dilbert
Furniture
Office buildings